Don't Let Them Shoot the Kite is a 1989 Turkish drama film, co-written, co-produced and directed by Tunç Başaran based on a 1986 novella by , featuring Nur Sürer as a female political prisoner who befriends the child of a fellow inmate. The film was screened in competition at the 26th Antalya Golden Orange Film Festival, where it won Golden Oranges for Best Film, Best Actress, Best Screenplay and Best Cinematography, the 10th Mediterranean International Film Festival, where it won 2nd Best Film, and the 8th Istanbul International Film Festival, where it won Best Turkish Film. The film was selected as the Turkish entry for the Best Foreign Language Film at the 62nd Academy Awards, but was not accepted as a nominee.

The film is set in 1984 Ankara, during the aftermath of the 1980 Turkish coup. It is currently available to legally stream with English subtitles through the German media website .

Plot
When a woman is sent to prison for drug smuggling, Barış, her young son, is sent with her, as is the custom in Turkey. Inside this all-women’s penitentiary, Barış searches for companionship and guidance—and finds them both in the form of Inci (Nur Sürer), a political prisoner with whom he forms a very special bond.  A beautifully observed, tender story of the growing affection between a woman and a child who is not her own, Tunç Başaran’s film, with a screenplay by  based on her novel, builds an effective counterpoint between the prison world, with its discipline, intrigues and threat of violence, and the private space Inci and Barış manage to create for themselves. Voted Best Turkish Film of the Year at the 1989 Istanbul Film Festival.
Venue: Walter Reade Theater, Howard Gilman Theater

Cast 
Nur Sürer as İnci   
 as Barış  
Füsun Demirel as Fatma   
 as Zeynep   
Güzin Özipek as Sultanteyze   
 as Selma  
 as Filiz
Meral Çetinkaya as Safinaz 
 as Sümbül

Production
The film is based on a 1986 novella by Feride Çiçekoğlu, who was inspired by the four years she spent as a political prisoner following the 1980 Turkish coup. Director Tunç Başaran's wife, Jale, served as the film's art director. The film was produced on a very limited budget, as was common in Turkey at the time. Başaran remarked, "If I were given $1 million to make a picture, I would use the money to make four films."

Although the film is set in Ankara, many of the prison scenes were filmed in Istanbul's Sultanahmet Jail. Ankara's Ulucanlar Prison has also been identified as one of the filming locations.

Critical reception
In The Routledge Dictionary of Turkish Cinema, Gönül Dönmez-Colin calls Don't Let Them Shoot the Kite "one of the classics of Turkish cinema", and in World Film Locations: Istanbul, Özlem Köksal writes that "[Baris] leaning against the imposing prison wall with hands in his pockets is definitely an iconic image in Turkish cinema."

Kevin Thomas of the Los Angeles Times named Don't Let Them Shoot the Kite as a highlight of the 1990 L.A. Film Festival.

See also
 List of submissions to the 62nd Academy Awards for Best Foreign Language Film
 List of Turkish submissions for the Academy Award for Best Foreign Language Film

References

External links 
 

1980s prison films
1989 crime drama films
1989 films
Turkish crime drama films
Films set in Ankara
Films set in Turkey
Films set in 1984
Films shot in Ankara
Golden Orange Award for Best Film winners
1980s Turkish-language films